Four Seasons Wines Limited is an Indian winery which was established in 2006, based in Bangalore, India. It produces wines from grapes grown around Sahyadri valley in Maharashtra. It is a subsidiary of United Spirits Limited (USL), which is itself part of the United Breweries Group (UB Group). Four Seasons Wines manufactures and markets wines in India. It provides red, white, and rosé wines. Four Seasons Wines markets its wines under two brand names: Zinzi and Four Seasons.

Vineyard 

Four Seasons Wines' vineyard is located in Baramati, around 65 km from Pune and set amidst the Western Ghats near the village of Rotti, India, and has a one million case capacity. The vineyard is built over a plot of around fifty acres and is expanding to 300.

Wines 

Four Seasons Wines makes varietal wine from the following grape varieties: three red grapes (Cabernet Sauvignon, Shiraz and Merlot), three white (Sauvignon blanc, Chenin blanc and Viognier), and a Rosé (Blush). The Barrique Reserve Cabernet Sauvignon and Barrique Reserve Shiraz are aged for a year in French oak barrels before being bottled.

Awards 

 Four Seasons Barrique Reserve Cabernet Sauvignon wins honours at IWC 2010.
 Four Seasons Viognier wins Gold Medal at Sommelier India Wine Competition.
 Four Seasons Sauvignon Blanc wins Silver Medal at Sommelier India Wine Competition.
 Four Seasons Barrique Reserve Shiraz wins Bronze Medal at Sommelier India Wine Competition.
 Ritu Wines won 4 Bronze medals at the 2012 Cathay Pacific Hong Kong International Wine&Spirit Competition (HKIWSC).

References

External links 
 Official Website

Wineries of India
Wine brands
Indian drink brands
Companies based in Bangalore
United Spirits brands
2006 establishments in Karnataka
Indian companies established in 2006